The Common Informers Act 1951 (14 & 15 Geo. 6, c. 39) is an Act of the United Kingdom Parliament that abolishes the principle of, and procedures concerning a common informer.

Background
A common informer was a person who provided evidence on criminal trials or prosecuted for breaches of Irish penal laws solely for the purpose of being rewarded with the penalty recovered, or a share of it. In medieval England, there was no police force and the state bureaucracy was insufficiently well developed to be able to ensure obedience to new laws. The practice of allowing the public to sue for penalties was successful and soon became widespread.

An action by a common informer was termed a "popular" or qui tam action. A legal action by an informer had to be brought within a year of the offence, unless a specific time was prescribed by the statute. The informer had to prove his case strictly and was given no assistance by the court being denied discovery.

Following the Revolution of 1688 in England, the Popery Act 1698 introduced a reward of £100 for the apprehension of any Roman Catholic priest. The result was that Catholics were placed at the mercy of common informers who harassed them for the sake of gain, even when the government would have left them in peace.

Jonathan Swift described common informers as "a detestable race of people" while Edward Coke called them "viperous vermin".

In 1931, Millie Orpen, a solicitor's clerk, brought an action as a common informer against a cinema chain for opening on a succession of Sundays, contrary to the Sunday Observance Act 1780, s.1. Orpen claimed £25,000 against the cinema company and individual members of its board of directors. The claim was based on a forfeit of £200 per performance per defendant. The judge, Mr Justice Rowlatt, expressed some distaste for the proceedings. He found against the cinema chain, awarding Orpen £5,000, with costs, but found for the individual directors on the grounds there was no evidence they were guilty on any particular Sunday. Costs were awarded to the directors against Orpen. The judge granted a stay pending an appeal by the company. Later in the year, Orpen brought a claim against another chain, but was thwarted by a change in the law legalising Sunday opening for cinemas before her case could be decided.

The Act
Many statutes, such as the Simony Act 1588 and the White Herring Fisheries Act 1771, provide for penalties for offenders in breach of the provisions. Before the Common Informers Act 1951, there were further statutory provisions for the levied penalties to be paid over to an informer. For example, section 15 of the Commissioners Clauses Act 1847,  still in force, states:

The Common Informers Act 1951 removed the right to recover a penalty from 48 Acts, including:

Most of these have themselves been repealed. The Crown was also prohibited from bringing actions as a common informer (s.1(5)). The former penalties were not all abolished but were commuted to £100, later revised to level 3 of the standard scale though the purpose of this provision was obscure as it was thought that not even the Crown could now bring such an action.

Subsequent developments
Qui tam claims were codified in the United States under the False Claims Act, under which Lincoln sought to penalise manufacturers who sold his Army shoddy goods. It saw a revival in the U.S. from 1986 in actions by "whistleblowers". In May 2007 a consultative document from the Home Office Ministry of John Reid raised the question of whether members of the public who informed on companies or individuals defrauding the government should be entitled to a reward.  It gained the attention of the House on 24 May 2007:
The Parliamentary Under-Secretary of State for the Home Department (Mr. Vernon Coaker): Seizing criminal assets delivers a wide range of benefits, from depriving criminals of capital to reducing the incentives for crime and the harm caused by crime, as well as promoting fairness and confidence in the criminal justice system. In 2006-07 the total amount recouped by all agencies
involved in asset recovery in England, Wales and Northern Ireland was £125 million. This is a five-fold increase over five years. We want to build on this success. The Government are therefore publishing today an Asset Recovery Action Plan. The Action Plan has two purposes. Firstly it sets out robust proposals on how we are to reach our challenging target of recovering £250 million of the proceeds of crime by 2009-10. The Plan goes on to outline, for consultation, policy proposals for taking things further, including some radical ideas to move towards the Government's long term vision of detecting up to £1 billion of criminal assets.

The consultation period will end on 23 November 2007. A copy of the Action Plan is being placed in the Library of the House.

Submissions were obtained from the Fraud Advisory Panel, the Institute of Chartered Accountants, and the Local Authorities Coordinators of Regulatory Services, amongst others.

References

Bibliography

United Kingdom Acts of Parliament 1951
Civil procedure
Criminal procedure
Legal history of the United Kingdom